Ernest William Richardson (8 March 1916 – 1977) was an English professional footballer who played in the Football League for Birmingham and Swansea Town.

Richardson was born in Bishop Burton in the East Riding of Yorkshire. He began his football career with nearby Leven before joining Birmingham in 1936, and made his debut in the First Division on 22 April 1936 in a 4–1 home win against Sheffield Wednesday. Richardson, a small but very pacy outside right, found himself behind Frank White and Dennis Jennings in the pecking order, and played only twice more for the first team. He joined Swansea Town in November 1938, where he scored twice in 18 Second Division appearances.

References

1916 births
People from Bishop Burton
1977 deaths
English footballers
Association football wingers
Birmingham City F.C. players
Swansea City A.F.C. players
English Football League players
Date of death missing
Footballers from Yorkshire